Bix and Assendon is a mainly rural civil parish in the high Chilterns just north of Henley-on-Thames in South Oxfordshire, England. The parish includes the villages of Bix, Lower Assendon and Middle Assendon. The 2011 census recorded a parish population of 531 mainly clustered in the settlements mentioned in its total area of 9.79 km2.

References

External links

The Parish of Bix & Assendon

Civil parishes in Oxfordshire